The 1995 Ohio Valley Conference men's basketball tournament was the final event of the 1994–95 season in the Ohio Valley Conference. The tournament was held March 2–4, 1995, at Nashville Municipal Auditorium in Nashville, Tennessee.

 defeated  in the championship game, 92–84, to win their 7th OVC men's basketball tournament.

The Racers received an automatic bid to the 1995 NCAA tournament as the No. 15 seed in the Southeast region.

Format
Seven of the nine conference members participated in the tournament field. They were seeded based on regular season conference records, with the top seed (Tennessee State) receiving a bye to the semifinal round. The teams were re-seeded after the opening round.  and  did not participate.

Bracket

References

Ohio Valley Conference men's basketball tournament
Tournament
Ohio Valley Conference men's basketball tournament
Ohio Valley Conference men's basketball tournament
Basketball competitions in Nashville, Tennessee
College basketball tournaments in Tennessee